The Type 2 12 cm mortar is a smooth bore, muzzle-loading type mortar which, except for the firing mechanism, closely resembles the conventional Stokes-Brandt 81 mm mortar. The bipod and cradle of the two types of mortars are identical, except for size and the fact that the bipod legs can be removed as a unit from the cradle of the 120 mm mortar. The large, ribbed base plate has only one socket for the spherical projection on the barrel. A Type 2 120 mm mortar was reported captured at Leyte.

Design
The mortar examined was manufactured at Osaka Arsenal in 1943. The total weight of the weapon is reported to be , of which  represent the weight of the tube,  the bipod, and  the base plate. The weapon allegedly can be fired by dropping the shell down the tube to strike a fixed firing pin, or it can be trigger fired. Elevation of the piece, accomplished by adjustment of the bipod legs, ranges from 800 to 1,422 mils; traverse, at a 45-degree elevation, is 180 mils and at 70 degrees 210 mils. Maximum range of the piece is reported to be .

The base plate is very heavy and is fitted with four carrying handles. The sight bracket fits the standard mortar sight. The barrel is heavily reinforced at the muzzle and has two raised ribs midway of the barrel, between which the barrel clamping collar is held. The firing mechanism is similar to that used on the Type 99, 81 mm short mortar. After the weapon has been loaded, a plunger, which projects upward from the mortar breech, is struck with a mallet or similar instrument, thus camming out the firing pin and firing the mortar. A safety lock is fitted on this firing plunger.

Ammunition
The ammunition is of the conventional streamlined, fin-stabilized type. It uses the ignition cartridge and powder-increment type of propellant. The round uses the standard type 100 mortar fuze and weighs . Two rounds of ammunition are packed in a wooden box, lined with asphalt impregnated paper. The ignition cartridges are assembled into the rounds as packed, the fuzes are packed in tear-top cans, and the doughnut-type increments are packed in tar-paper bags.

References

Bibliography
 US War Department Special Series No 30 Japanese Mortars and Grenade Dischargers 1945
 US War Department TM-E 30-480 Handbook on Japanese Military Forces 1 October 1944

External links

http://www3.plala.or.jp/takihome/mortar.htm#2

World War II infantry weapons of Japan
Infantry mortars of Japan
World War II mortars of Japan
120mm mortars
Weapons and ammunition introduced in 1943